Francisco de la Cerda Córdoba, O.P. (died 1551) was a Roman Catholic prelate who served as Bishop of Islas Canarias (1551).

Biography
Francisco de la Cerda Córdoba was born in Córdoba, Spain and ordained a priest in the Order of Preachers.
On 19 Jan 1551, he was appointed during the papacy of Pope Julius III as Bishop of Islas Canarias.
He served as Bishop of Islas Canarias until his death on 14 Nov 1551.

See also
Roman Catholicism in Spain

References

External links and additional sources
 (for Chronology of Bishops) 
 (for Chronology of Bishops) 

16th-century Roman Catholic bishops in Spain
Bishops appointed by Pope Julius III
1551 deaths
Dominican bishops